Ezra Kenyoke Sambu (born September 4, 1978, in Marigat, Baringo County) is a Kenyan sprinter who specializes in the 400 metres.

His personal best time is 44.43 seconds, achieved in July 2003 in Nairobi. This ranks him third in Kenya, behind Samson Kitur and Charles Gitonga, and fifth in Africa, behind Innocent Egbunike, Kitur, Gitonga and Davis Kamoga. He won gold at the 2003 Afro-Asian Games.

Sambu was the captain of the Kenyan team at the 2007 All-Africa Games. He planned to retire after the 2008 Summer Olympics in Beijing, China He did not, however, participate at the Olympics. As of 2009, he is reported to be still active, although sidelined due to injury.

References

External links
 

1978 births
Living people
Kenyan male sprinters
Olympic athletes of Kenya
Athletes (track and field) at the 2000 Summer Olympics
Athletes (track and field) at the 2004 Summer Olympics
Athletes (track and field) at the 2006 Commonwealth Games
African Games gold medalists for Kenya
African Games medalists in athletics (track and field)
Athletes (track and field) at the 2003 All-Africa Games
Commonwealth Games competitors for Kenya
People from Baringo County